Love Ways is the fourth EP by the indie rock band Spoon. It was released on October 24, 2000, by Merge Records.

Track listing
 "Change My Life" – 4:29
 "I Didn't Come Here to Die" – 3:08
 "Jealousy" – 2:09
 "The Figures of Art" – 1:46
 "Chips and Dip" – 4:02

Personnel
Britt Daniel - all vocals, guitars, bass guitar, piano and all kinds of keyboards
Jim Eno - big old drum kit

References

2000 EPs
Spoon (band) albums
Merge Records EPs